Viktor Sodoma (born 5 July 1945) is a Czech singer and occasional actor, considered to be a pioneer of 1960s Czech rock and roll and beat music. He began his career by performing at Semafor theatre and during the 1960s, sang with the bands Flamengo and Matadors. After the start of the Czechoslovak Normalization period in 1968, Sodoma returned to the theatre. Between 1971 and 1973, he sang in a band called Shut Up, who originally performed at Semafor and eventually changed their name to František Ringo Čech Group. Sodoma recorded one album with the band, 1972's Haló děťátka, and was replaced a year later by Jiří Schelinger. He has since performed in various ensembles, including George & Beatovens, as well as having a solo singing career.

Selected discography
with the Matadors
 The Matadors (EP, 1966)
 The Matadors (EP, 1967)
 The Matadors (LP, 1968)

with František Ringo Čech Group
 Haló děťátka (1972)

with George & Beatovens
 Rock n' Roll (as Karel Kahovec, Viktor Sodoma, George & Beatovens – 2012)

Solo compilations
 Viktor Sodoma Zpívá Nejznámější České Hity 1 (2001)
 Viktor Sodoma Zpívá Nejznámější České Hity 2 (2001)
 Viktor Sodoma Zpívá Nejznámější České Hity 3 (2001)
 Viktor Sodoma Zpívá Nejznámější České Hity 4 (2001)
 Pop Galerie (2008)
 Země Lásky... (1968–1972) (2010)
 Snad Jsem To Já... (1973–1984) (2010)

Other albums
 Boublík (Hana Zagorová, Viktor Sodoma, Jiří Štědroň – 1970)

References

External links

 
 

1945 births
Living people
People from Prague
Male pop singers
20th-century Czech male singers
21st-century Czech male singers
Czech pop singers
Czechoslovak male singers